Claudio Daniel Borghi Bidos (born 28 September 1964), nicknamed Bichi, is an Argentine naturalized Chilean football manager and former player who played as an attacking midfielder.

He has been active as a player and coach mostly in Argentina and Chile, and also played in Italy, Switzerland, Brazil and Mexico; and coached in Ecuador.

Biography

Club career

Borghi started his career as an attacking midfielder for Argentinos Juniors in the early 1980s. He was considered a bright young star for Argentina and tipped by many to be on a level with Diego Maradona.

Borghi's exceptional performance in the 1985 Intercontinental Cup final (Argentinos Juniors lost to Juventus on penalties) drew the attention of A.C. Milan president Silvio Berlusconi, and Borghi was signed for the club in 1987. Borghi was drafted in alongside Dutchmen Marco van Basten and Ruud Gullit, but, since teams were allowed on only two foreign players, he was loaned out to Como for the 1987–88 season. The next year the maximum number of foreign players was increased to three, but Milan coach Arrigo Sacchi – who had won respect by securing the Scudetto a few months earlier – asked his team to sign another Dutch player, Frank Rijkaard, instead of bringing Borghi back, as Berlusconi wished. Afterwards Borghi left Italy and tried his luck in Switzerland with Neuchâtel Xamax, before returning to South America where he played for River Plate, Flamengo and Independiente. Eventually he wound up in Chile, winning the Recopa Sudamericana and Copa Interamericana with Colo-Colo in 1992, and concluded his playing career with Santiago Wanderers in 1999.

International career
Borghi was called up to the Argentina national team for the 1986 FIFA World Cup in Mexico, where he won the World Cup with Argentina and played alongside Diego Maradona at his peak.

Managerial career

After retiring as a player, Borghi started a career as a manager in Chile, between 2004 and 2005 he worked as the coach of Audax Italiano.

In 2006 Borghi was appointed as the coach of Colo-Colo. He led the team to four consecutive league championships between 2006 and 2007. He also led the club to the final of the 2006 Copa Sudamericana and received the South American Coach of the Year award in 2006.

In June 2008, Borghi returned to Argentina to become the 19th coach of Independiente in the last 10 years. Borghi was unable to accomplish a winning campaign and resigned from the position on 5 October 2008 following, a 1–0 loss to Huracán. While at Independiente, Borghi managed the team for 17 matches, winning 4, drawing 9, and losing 4.

In June 2009, he returned to Argentinos Juniors as their new manager following their dismal 2009 Clausura campaign, which had seen the club finish 20th (last) in the table, with only 2 wins from their 19 games.

After leading the club to a 6th-place finish in the 2009 Apertura championship, Borghi and the Argentinos Juniors directors set the target of surpassing the 61 points from the 2007–08 season to avoid dropping further down the relegation table.

In the 2010 Clausura championship, Argentinos recorded a 6–3 win against Lanús in their second fixture of the campaign, but after five games this was their only win, with two draws and two defeats. Subsequently, Argentinos won their 6th fixture against Estudiantes de La Plata, which was the start of a 14-game unbeaten streak that saw Argentinos finish 1 point ahead of Estudiantes at the end of the season. The most significant result in this 14-game run was in their penultimate fixture against title challengers Independiente, which saw Argentinos come back from 1–3 down to win 4–3, which featured two goals in the final minutes of the game to seal the win and leave Argentinos top of the table with one game to play. They sealed their first domestic championship in 25 years with a 1–2 away win against Huracán in the Estadio Tomás Adolfo Ducó.

This championship was Borghi's fifth title with the club, considering the four he had won as a player in the mid-1980s. Borghi achieved a great turnaround in the fortunes of the team that had finished in last place only one year previously and the successful Clausura championship campaign secured qualification for the 2010 Copa Sudamericana and the 2011 Copa Libertadores. However, he decided to leave Argentinos at the end of the tournament.

On 21 May 2010 Boca Juniors signed Borghi as their new head coach. His period in Boca was short however, as he resigned on 17 November, after obtaining 17 points over 42 possible in his 14 official games. His departure was subsequent to a 0–1 defeat to River Plate in the 2010 Apertura's Superclásico, that left Boca in the 15th league table position.

On 24 February 2011, he was presented by the Chilean Football Federation as the new coach, in replacement of Marcelo Bielsa, under a contract of US$1.5 Million per year until the end of the 2014 FIFA World Cup playoffs, to be extended automatically in case of qualification.

On 14 November 2012, Borghi was sacked after poor performances, including five straight losses, three in the World Cup qualifiers, and two in international friendlies.

Managerial statistics with Chile

Personal life
His son, Filippo Borghi Pagnuco, was with the Unión Española youth ranks as a striker, but he switched to the rugby union when he was a student of Redland School, representing Chile at international tournaments.

Honours

Player

Club
Argentinos Juniors
 Primera División Argentina (2): 1984, 1985
 Copa Libertadores: 1985
 Copa Interamericana: 1985

Colo-Colo
 Copa Interamericana: 1992
 Recopa Sudamericana: 1992

International
Argentina
 FIFA World Cup: 1986

Manager

Club
Colo-Colo
 Torneo Apertura (2): 2006, 2007
 Torneo Clausura (2): 2006, 2007.

Argentinos Juniors
 Torneo Clausura: 2010

Individual

Manager
 South American Coach of the Year: 2006

References

External links

 

1964 births
Living people
Argentine people of Friulian descent
Sportspeople from Buenos Aires Province
Argentine sportspeople of Italian descent
Argentine footballers
Argentine emigrants to Chile
Argentine expatriate footballers
Argentina international footballers
Argentinos Juniors footballers
A.C. Milan players
Como 1907 players
Neuchâtel Xamax FCS players
Club Atlético River Plate footballers
CR Flamengo footballers
Club Atlético Independiente footballers
Unión de Santa Fe footballers
Club Atlético Huracán footballers
Colo-Colo footballers
Club Atlético Platense footballers
Correcaminos UAT footballers
O'Higgins F.C. footballers
Audax Italiano footballers
Santiago Wanderers footballers
Argentine Primera División players
Serie A players
Swiss Super League players
Campeonato Brasileiro Série A players
Chilean Primera División players
Liga MX players
Expatriate footballers in Italy
Expatriate footballers in Switzerland
Expatriate footballers in Brazil
Expatriate footballers in Mexico
Expatriate footballers in Chile
1986 FIFA World Cup players
Copa Libertadores-winning players
FIFA World Cup-winning players
Association football midfielders
Argentine football managers
Argentine expatriate football managers
Naturalized citizens of Chile
Chilean football managers
Chilean expatriate football managers
Audax Italiano managers
Colo-Colo managers
Club Atlético Independiente managers
Argentinos Juniors managers
Boca Juniors managers
Chile national football team managers
L.D.U. Quito managers
Chilean Primera División managers
Argentine Primera División managers
Expatriate football managers in Chile
Expatriate football managers in Ecuador
2011 Copa América managers
Argentine expatriate sportspeople in Italy
Argentine expatriate sportspeople in Switzerland
Argentine expatriate sportspeople in Brazil
Argentine expatriate sportspeople in Chile
Argentine expatriate sportspeople in Mexico
Argentine expatriate sportspeople in Ecuador
Chilean expatriate sportspeople in Ecuador
People from Morón Partido
Canal del Fútbol color commentators
TNT Sports Chile color commentators
Chilean association football commentators